Battery is a brand of energy drinks produced by the Finnish brewery Sinebrychoff. Their stimulating effects are based on coffee and guarana extracts as well as taurine.

Sinebrychoff is part of the international brewery group Carlsberg. The energy drink was launched in 1997 and is currently sold in various flavors in over 35 countries.

The basic idea of the brand is to provide energy like an electric battery and to look like one. The brand's slogan is "Keeps you going".

Products
In addition to the brand's original energy drink, called Battery Energy Drink, several variations have been produced, including coffeed, cranberry, sugarfree, gingered, juiced orange, and Battery Jungled. The availability of the different flavors varies by country and according to the market.
 
In Finland previously there has also been available other flavors: Heat with cranberry and chili flavors, orange juiced and energy Shot.

The energy drinks are mainly sold in plastic bottles of 40cl and in cans of 33cl. In August 2010 in Finland a limited-edition pint cans (0.568 liters) were launched as "Battery Limited Edition 0.568 L". Currently the product is sold under the name "Big Edition" since the sales are no longer limited.

The design of the bottles was renewed in March 2011 and the content was changed to 40cl instead of 45cl. At the same time the price per bottle decreased.

Internationalization
Developed and launched in Finland in January 1997, Battery has been sold in international markets since its inception. In the summer of 1997, it was launched in Estonia, Latvia and Lithuania, and in the following year in the rest of Norway and Sweden. Nowadays, it is being sold in approximately 40 countries in all populated continents.

There have been local specialties in product characteristics and promotions. For example, the appearance of the can in Yemen has been adjusted to better fit Arabic culture by replacing the plus sign with a lightning bolt.

References

Further reading

External links
 Battery energy drinks - official website

Energy drinks
Products introduced in 1997
Finnish drinks